Quentin Bena (born 11 May 1998) is a French professional footballer who plays as a defensive midfielder for Liga II club Dinamo București.  Bena made his senior debut for Niort in April 2017 having signed for the club as a youth player from Châtellerault four years previously.

Playing career
Bena was born in Poitiers and played junior football for Coussay-les-Bois, Saint-Pierre-de-Maillé, Pleumartin and Châtellerault. After Châtellerault won an under-15s tournament in Jaunay-Clan in June 2013, during which he scored a goal and made an assist in the final, Bena joined the youth setup at Chamois Niortais. Over the next four years, he progressed through the ranks at the club, representing Niort at the under-17 and under-19 levels, and playing for the reserve team in the Championnat de France Amateur 2. Originally playing as a forward as a junior, he became a defensive midfielder during his time at Niort.

Towards the end of the 2016–17 season with Niort already assured of a mid-table finish, Bena began to become involved in the first-team squad. He eventually made his Ligue 2 debut on 21 April 2017, coming on as a substitute for the injured Laurent Agouazi in a 1–3 defeat away at AC Ajaccio. He made his first start for the senior team the following week, playing in an unfamiliar left-back position in the 0–3 defeat to Reims at the Stade René Gaillard. He went on to make two further appearances during the remainder of the season, and was rewarded for his breakthrough into the first-team with a three-year professional contract, which he signed on 9 May 2017.

Bena left Niort at the end of the 2021–22 season, having made 48 appearances for the club in all competitions.

In August 2022, he joined Romanian side Dinamo București.

Personal life
Born in France, Bena is of Congolese descent.

Career statistics

References

External links
 
 

1998 births
Living people
Sportspeople from Poitiers
French footballers
French sportspeople of Democratic Republic of the Congo descent
Association football midfielders
Chamois Niortais F.C. players
FC Dinamo București players
Ligue 2 players
Liga II players
Footballers from Nouvelle-Aquitaine
Black French sportspeople
Expatriate footballers in Romania